"Stars" is a 1972 song from Dan Fogelberg's debut album, Home Free. It appears as the second track on the album. The song was written by Fogelberg and produced by Norbert Putnam, and was released on the Epic label.

It was later covered Amy Holland in 1980 on her self-titled debut album and by Alison Krauss on her 2001 album New Favorite.

References

1972 songs
1972 singles
Dan Fogelberg songs
Amy Holland songs
1980 singles
Songs written by Dan Fogelberg
Epic Records singles
Capitol Records singles